Hugh Coe is a British atmospheric physicist, currently Head of Atmospheric Sciences and Professor of Atmospheric Composition at the University of Manchester. His research investigates the physics and chemistry of atmospheric aerosols, including their role in climate change and air pollution.

Early life and career 

Coe took a BSc in physics at Newcastle University in 1989, followed by a PhD titled "The Exchange of Nitrogen Dioxide and Ozone Between Vegetation and the Atmosphere" at UMIST in 1993. He has worked at the University of Manchester ever since.

Research interests 

Coe studies the physics and chemistry of aerosols in the atmosphere, including the part they play in climate change through interactions with clouds and solar radiation. He also studies the role of aerosols in the transport of air pollution, including regional and transboundary (long-distance) pollution caused by biomass burning and atmospheric dust. Coe has worked on air pollution studies in the UK, India, and China, and was the principal investigator of a major study into air pollution in the Indo-Gangetic Plain.

Coe has also helped to develop new analytic techniques for studying air pollution. These include "transformative" approaches to aerosol mass spectrometry, which have led to "an unprecedented understanding of the global distribution of atmospheric fine particulate matter composition", and using the single particle soot photometer for studying how particulates are transported.

Awards 

Coe was awarded the Vilhelm Bjerknes Medal (2022) for "pioneering the science of atmospheric composition through instrument development and fine particle measurements, to study their impact on air quality, clouds and climate". According to the European Geosciences Union, which made the award: "Hugh Coe’s body of work on understanding the chemistry and global distribution of aerosols provide the underpinning data used to develop and test our global atmospheric models, and are foundational in our assessments of air pollution and climate change". Coe was recognized as one of the 100 Most Highly Cited Researchers in Geosciences in 2014 and 2018 by Clarivate. In 2015, Coe was a joint recipient of a British Academy Newton Advanced Fellowship, with Lin Wang of Fudan University, for research into secondary organic aerosols using time-of-flight mass spectrometry.

Media appearances 

Coe has made a number of radio, TV, and press appearances as an expert on air pollution issues, including such topics as Manchester's urban pollution
and its proposed clean-air zone, the atmospheric modelling of Iceland's Eyjafjallajökull volcano eruption in 2010, and reductions in air pollution during the COVID-19 lockdowns.

Selected publications

Papers

Books and book chapters

References

External links
 

Year of birth missing (living people)
Living people
Alumni of Newcastle University
Academics of the University of Manchester
Atmospheric chemists
Atmospheric physicists
British climatologists
British physicists
Air pollution in the United Kingdom